Thelma & Jerry is Thelma Houston's fifth album, released in 1977 on Motown Records. It is the first of two vocal duet albums Houston did with Jerry Butler. It includes the R&B chart hit, "It's a Lifetime Thing."

Track listing
 "Only the Beginning" (Lawrence Hanks, Rodney Massey)
 "And You've Got Me" (Homer Talbert, Patricia Henley)
 "It's a Lifetime Thing" (Keithen Carter, Michael Ward)
 "Medley:"If You Leave Me Now"/"Love So Right" (Peter Cetera/Barry Gibb, Robin Gibb, Maurice Gibb)
 "I Love You Through Windows" (Herman Wheatley, Keithen Carter, Michael Ward)
 "Joy Inside My Tears" (Stevie Wonder)
 "Sweet Love I've Found" (Don Daniels, Michael B. Sutton, Brenda Sutton)
 "(Play the Game of) Let's Pretend" (Kathy Wakefield, Michael B. Sutton, Brenda Sutton)
 "Let's Get Together" (Zane Grey, Len Ron Hanks, Skip Scarborough)

Personnel
Thelma Houston, Jerry Butler - lead vocals
Byron Gregory, Danny Leek, David T. Walker - guitar
David Shields, Henry Davis, Ron Harris - bass guitar
Clarence McDonald, John Barnes, Lawrence Hanks, Michael B. Sutton, Terry Friar - keyboards
Brian Grice, Ed Greene, James Gadson, Steve Cobb - drums
Melvin Sparks - percussion
Eddie "Bongo" Brown - congas
Brenda Sutton, Jesse Richardson, Judy Cheeks, Keithen Carter, Mattie Butler, Patricia Henley, Sue Conway - backing vocals
Annette Butler, Brenda M. Boyce, Georgia Ward, Homer Talbert, Naomi Henyard, Rhonda Jenkins, Steven Milburn, Tom Depierro - additional backing vocals and handclaps on "Only the Beginning"
Arthur G. Wright, David Blumberg, Paul David Wilson - arrangements

References

1977 albums
Thelma Houston albums
Albums produced by Hal Davis
Vocal duet albums
Motown albums